Judo at the 2015 Southeast Asian Games was held in EXPO Hall 2, Singapore from 6 to 8 June 2015.

Participating nations
A total of 82 athletes from nine nations competed in judo at the 2015 Southeast Asian Games:

Competition schedule
The following is the competition schedule for the judo competitions:

Medalists

Men

Women

Medal table

References

External links
  

2015 Southeast Asian Games events
2015
Asian Games, Southeast
2015 Asian Games, Southeast